Otto Burri (9 January 1928 – 25 January 2014) was a Swiss rower. He competed in the men's eight event at the 1948 Summer Olympics.

References

External links
 

1928 births
2014 deaths
Swiss male rowers
Olympic rowers of Switzerland
Rowers at the 1948 Summer Olympics
Place of birth missing